Miguel Angel Sánchez (born December 31, 1993) is a Dominican professional baseball pitcher who is a free agent. He previously played in Major League Baseball (MLB) for the Milwaukee Brewers.

Early life
When Sanchez didn’t receive any MLB contract offers as a 16 or 17 year old he took a job as a security guard at a bar in Los Arroces. A coach convinced Sanchez to get back into baseball by joining the Dominican Air Force to play in an amateur baseball league to potentially catch the eye of scouts. Sanchez continued to work his job as a security guard during this time.

Career
On January 26, 2016, Sánchez signed with the Milwaukee Brewers as an international free agent for $6,000. He made his professional debut with the Dominican Summer League Brewers, and also played for the Rookie-level AZL Brewers and the Single-A Wisconsin Timber Rattlers. In 18 games between the three teams, he posted a 2-2 record and 3.66 ERA.

Sánchez returned to Wisconsin for the 2017 season, posting a 3-6 record and 4.36 ERA in 32 appearances. The next year, he split the season between the High-A Carolina Mudcats, the Double-A Biloxi Shuckers, and the Triple-A Colorado Springs Sky Sox, logging a cumulative 2.52 ERA with 95 strikeouts in 64.1 innings of work. In 2019, Sánchez played for the Triple-A San Antonio Missions, pitching to a 
4-5 record and 4.35 ERA with 62 strikeouts in 60 innings pitched.

Sánchez did not play in a game in 2020 due to the cancellation of the minor league season because of the COVID-19 pandemic. He was assigned to the Triple-A Nashville Sounds to begin the 2021 season, and recorded a 3.22 ERA in 16 appearances with the team.

On June 22, 2021, Sánchez was selected to the 40-man roster and promoted to the major leagues for the first time. He made his debut later that night, throwing a scoreless inning against the Arizona Diamondbacks. He was outrighted to the Triple-A Nashville Sounds after the 2022 season, and opted to become a free agent.

References

External links

1993 births
Living people
People from Bonao
Major League Baseball players from the Dominican Republic
Dominican Republic expatriate baseball players in the United States
Major League Baseball pitchers
Milwaukee Brewers players
Wisconsin Timber Rattlers players
Arizona League Brewers players
Dominican Summer League Brewers players
Colorado Springs Sky Sox players
Biloxi Shuckers players
Carolina Mudcats players
Peoria Javelinas players
San Antonio Missions players
Toros del Este players
Nashville Sounds players
Dominican Republic military personnel
Air force personnel